The Austria men's national squash team represents Austria in international squash team competitions, and is governed by Österreichischer Squash Rackets Verband.

Current team
 Aqeel Rehman
 Jakob Dirnberger
 Florian Mader
 Daniel Haider
 Andreas Freudensprung

Results

World Team Squash Championships

European Squash Team Championships

See also 
 Austria Squash Rackets
 World Team Squash Championships

References 

Squash teams
Men's national squash teams
Squash
Men's sport in Austria
Squash in Austria